Husni Aizat Abdul Malik (5 June 1994 – 25 May 2014) was a Malaysian motorcycle racer. He competed in the Moto3 World Championship as a wildcard entrant in the 2013 Malaysian Grand Prix. He died in Kota Tinggi on Sunday 25 May 2014 following a road traffic accident.

Career statistics

Grand Prix motorcycle racing

By season

Races by year

References

External links
Profile on MotoGP.com
Profile on GPUpdate.net

1994 births
2014 deaths
Malaysian motorcycle racers
Moto3 World Championship riders
Road incident deaths in Malaysia